Thomas Tunnard (30 July 1918 – 25 August 2012) was an English cathedral organist, who served in St. Philip's Cathedral, Birmingham.

Background
Thomas Newburgh Tunnard was born on 30 July 1918 in Lexham, Norfolk. He was a chorister at St. George's Chapel, Windsor Castle, and then educated at Bedford School, the Royal College of Music and New College, Oxford 1937 - 1939, and 1945 - 1946.

From 1950 he was head of music at Warwick School.

In 1953 he founded the Warwick & Kenilworth Choral Society.

From 1958 he was head of music at King Edward's School, Birmingham, following in the footsteps of his predecessor Willis Grant at the Cathedral.

Died 25 August 2012

Career
Organist of:
 St Michael at the North Gate, Oxford 1946 - 1950
 Collegiate Church of St Mary, Warwick 1950 - 1958
 St. Philip's Cathedral, Birmingham 1958 - 1967

References

English classical organists
British male organists
Cathedral organists
1918 births
People educated at Bedford School
Alumni of New College, Oxford
Alumni of the Royal College of Music
2012 deaths
20th-century classical musicians
20th-century British male musicians
Male classical organists